WWLU is a non-commercial educational radio station in Lincoln University, Pennsylvania, which is owned and operated by Lincoln University. The station signed on in 1975 as WLIU. The call sign was changed to WWLU in July 2002, after the WLIU call sign was acquired by Long Island University, in Southampton, New York, for its radio station.

References

External links
 Official page on Lincoln University website
 

1975 establishments in Pennsylvania
Radio stations established in 1975
WLU